This is a list of named junctions (tsomet) and interchanges (mechlaf) in Israel in alphabetical order. Intersecting road numbers and/or road names are given in brackets. Alternative names by which junctions are known are also in brackets.

Junctions

A
 Abba Hillel Silver Junction (3, 4)
 Achihud Junction (70, 85)
 Ada Junction (652, 653)
 Adashim Junction (60, 73)
 Adi Junction (79, local road)
 Adumim Junction (1, 458)
 Afik Junction (98, 789)
 Akko East Junction (4, 85)
 Akko North Junction (8510, Golani Brigade Rd., Akko)
 Akko South Junction (8510, Yehonatan HeHashmona'i St., Akko)
 Almog Junction (1, local road)
 Alon Junction (65, 650)
  (75, 7513)
 Alumot Junction (767, 768)
 Ami'ad Junction (85, 90)
 Ar'ara BaNegev Junction (25, 80)
 Ariel Junction (5, 505, 4775)
 Atarot Junction (45, 50)
 Avital Junction (91, 9881)
 Azekah Junction (38, 383)

B
 Bareket Junction (40, 46, 453)
 Bar'on Junction (98, 959)
 Baruch Junction (73, 7255)
 Bashan Junction (87, 98)
 Bedek Junction (40, 4613)
 Be'erotayim Junction (57, 5704)
 Beit Aryeh Junction (446, 465, local road)
 Beit Dagan Junction (44, 412)
 Beit HaArava Junction (1, 90)
 Beit HaMeches Junction (91, 888)
 Beit Horon Junction (443, local roads)
 Beit Rimon Junction (77, 754)
 Beit Tsaida Junction (87, 888)
 Beka'ot Junction (57, 578)
 Bental Junction (959, local road)
 Betset Junction (4, 899)
 Bi'ina Junction (85, 8534)
 Bik'at Timna Junction (name of two different junctions on Highway 90 with local roads)
 Binyamina Junction (4, 653)
 Bnei Darom Junction (41, 42)

C
 Chabad Junction (44, 4402)

D
 Daliyot Junction (808, 869)
 Damun Junction (672, 721)
 Deir Hanna Junction (805, 806)
 Dimona Junction (25, 204)
 Dotan Junction (60, 585)
 Dror Junction (4, 553)
 Dvira Junction (6 ,325)

E
 Eilabun Junction (65, 806)
 Ein Afek Junction (4, 7911)
 Ein HaKore Junction (42, 431)
 Ein HaMifrats Junction (4, 8510)
 Ein Hatsva Junction (90, 227)
 Ein Zeitim Junction (89, 886)
  (40, 46, 453)
 El-Rom Junction (98, 9799)
 Elyakhin Junction (581, 5812)
 Eshkolot Junction (4, 232)
 Eshta'ol Junction (38, 395)
 Evlayim Junction (70, 781)
 Eyal Junction (444, 551)
 Ezka Junction (38, 383)

F
 Fureidis Junction (4, 70)

G
 Gadot Junction (91, 918)
 Gama Junction (232, 242)
 Ganim Junction (40, 483)
 Gazit Junction (65, 7276)
 Gedera Junction (7, 40)
 Ginaton Junction (40, 443)
 Gitai Junction (5, 505)
 Giv'at Ko'ah Junction (444, 465)
 Giv'at Yeruham Junction (204, 224)
 Giv'at Ze'ev Junction (45, 436, 443)
 Giv'onim Junction (436, local road)
 Golomb Junction (50, Golomb St. in Jerusalem)
 Gome Junction (90, 977)
 Gonen Junction (918, 959)
 Gov Ga'ash Junction (Sakhikh Junction) (978, 9799)
 Gush Etzion Junction (60, 367)

H
 HaAmakim Junction (Jalame Junction) (70, 75)
 HaArava Junction (25, 90)
 Hadasim Junction (4, local road)
 Hadera Junction (4, Shim'oni St., Hadera)
 Hadera East Junction (65, local road)
 HaDo'ar Junction (463, local road)
 HaEmir Junction ("West" Junction) (959, 978)
 HaGdi Junction (34, 293)
 Halafta Junction (85, 806)
 HaLohem HaBedu'i Junction (77, local road)
 Halukim Junction (40, 204)
 HaMapalim Junction (87, 808)
 Hamat Gader Junction (98, 7599)
 HaMaskit (57, 557)
 HaMetsudot Junction (90, 99)
 HaMovil Junction (77, 79)
 Hamra Junction (57, 508)
 Hananya Junction (Sheva Junction) (85, 866)
 HaNatsiv Junction (90, 6678)
 HaNegev Junction (40, 211)
 Hanita Junction (899, 8990)
 Hanna Junction (65, 652)
 HaNokdim Junction (Ohalim Junction) (40, 406)
 HaOgen Junction (4, 5700)
 Har Eitan Junction (395, 3965)
 Har Harif Junction (10, 171)
 Harish Junction (574, 6353)
 HaRo'e Junction (4, 581)
 HaRuhot Junction (40, 171)
 HaSargel Junction (65, 675)
 HaSharon Junction (Beit Lid) (4, 57)
 HaShayara Junction (70, local road)
 HaShiryon Junction (Nefah Junction) (91, 978)
 HaShoftim Junction (4, Jerusalem Blvd., Goshen Blvd., Kiryat Motzkin/Kiryat Bialik)
 HaShomrim Junction (75, 722)
 Hassidim Junction (70, 762)
 HaTishbi Junction (66, 70, 722)
 Hatrurim Junction (31, 258)
 HeAsor Junction (4, Ben Gurion Blvd., Weizmann Blvd., Kiryat Motzkin/Kiryat Bialik)
 Hefer Junction (4, 5720)
 Hilazon Junction (804, 805)
 Hiram Junction (89, 899)
 Holot Interchange (4, 20)
 Horshat Tal Junction (99, 918)
 Horshim Junction (444, 5233)
 Hosen Junction (89, 864)
 Hulda Junction (3, 411)

I
 Immanuel Junction (55, 5066)
 Iron Junction (Mishmar HaGvul Junction) (65, 574)
 Issachar Junction (71, 716)

J
 Julis Junction (70, 8533)

K
 Kabri Junction (70, 89)
 Kadarim Junction (Nahal Amud Junction) (65, 85)
 Kaf Het Junction (Koah Junction) (90, 899)
 Kalaniyot Junction (574, 581)
 Karmiel Junction (85, Nesi'ei Israel Blvd., Karmiel)
 Karmiel West Junction (85, 784)
 Katsrin North Junction (9088, 9098)
 Katsrin South Junction (87, 9088)
 Kerem Junction (386, 395)
 Keshet Junction (87, oil pipeline road)
 Kfar Masaryk Junction (4, local road)
 Kfar Nahum Junction (87, 90)
 Kfar Saba East Junction (55, 5504)
 Kfar Tavor Junction (56, 767)
 Kineret Junction (90, 767)
 Kiryat Chaim Junction (HaTsrif) (4, 781)
 Kishon Junction (4, 75)
 Kisufim Junction (242, 2410)
 Kochav HaYarden Junction (90, 717)
 Koranit Junction (784, 7933)
 Korazim Junction (90, 8277)
 Ktura Junction (40, 90)

L
 Lehavot HaBashan Junction (918, 977)

M
 Ma'agan Junction (92, 98)
 Ma'ale Efrayim Junction (505, 508)
 Ma'ale Gamla Junction (92, 869)
 Ma'asiyahu Junction (44, 434)
 Maccabim Junction (443, 4466)
 Maccabim-Re'ut Junction (443, Yair Pereg St., Modi'in-Maccabim-Re'ut)
 Mahanayim Junction (90, 91)
 Magshimim Junction (98, 808, local road)
 Mal'akhi Junction (Qastina) (3, 40)
 Ma'on Junction (232, 241)
 Mas'ada Junction (98, 99)
 Mash'abim Junction (40, 211)
 Masua Junction (90, local road)
 Megiddo Junction (65, 66)
 Mehola Junction (90, 578)
 Mei Ami Junction (65, 6535)
 Mekhora Junction (57, local road)
 Meron Junction (89, 866)
 Metzer Junction (574, 5923)
 Migdal Junction (90, 807)
 Migdal Afek Junction (444, 471)
 Misgav Junction (784, 805)
 Mishmar HaGvul Junction (Iron Junction) (65, 574)
 Mivtahim Junction (232, 2310)
 Mivtsa Horev Junction (10, 211)
 Modi'im Junction (443, 444, 4314)
 Moreshet Junction (781, 784)
 Mughar Junction (806, 807)

N
 Nahal Amud Junction (Kadarim Junction) (65, 85)
 Nahal Hadera Junction (4, 65)
 Nahal Tsalmon North Junction (65, 807)
 Nahal Tsalmon South Junction (65, 807)
 Nahalal Junction (73, 75)
 Nahariya Junction (4, 89)
 Nahshon Junction (3, 44)
 Nashut Junction (91, 9088)
 Navot Junction (71, 675)
 Nazareth North Junction (75, 754)
 Nazareth South Junction (60, 75)
 Nefah Junction (HaShiryon Junction) (91, 978)
 Nes Harim Junction (386, 3866)
 Nesher Junction (705, 752)
 Netivot Junction (25, 34)
 Netofa Junction (65, 785)
 Nirbata Junction (574, 6403)
 Nir Tzvi Junction (44, 4313)
 Nitzanei Oz Junction (57, 5714)
 Nvalt Junction (444, 453)

O
 Odem Junction (57, 90)
 Ofarim Junction (446, 465)
 Ofer Junction (4, 7021)
 Ohalim Junction (HaNokdim Junction) (40, 406)
 Or Akiva Junction (4, 6511)
 Orha Junction (98, local road)
 Oren Junction (4, 721)

P
 Pal-Yam Junction (4, 651)
 Pardesiya Junction (4, 5613)
 Peres Junction (local roads, Golan Heights)
 Poran Junction (959, 9881)
 Poriya Junction (77, 768)
 Ptza'el Junction (90, 505)

Q

R
 Ra'anana Junction (4, 541)
 Rafid Junction (local roads, Golan Heights)
 Rama Junction (85, 804)
 Re'em Junction (Masmiyya) (3, 40)
 Re'im Junction (232, local road)
 Rimonim Junction (449, 458)
 Rosh HaAyin Junction (444, 483)
 Rosh Pinna Junction (90, 8677)
 Rotem Junction (25, 206)
 Ruppin Junction (4, 5711)

S
 Sakhikh Junction (Gov Ga'ash Junction) (978, 9799)
 Samach Junction (Kursi Junction) (92, 789)
 Samaria Junction (60, local PA road)
 Sayarim Junction (10, 12)
 Segula Junction (40, 481, HaNahal St., Petah Tikva)
 Sha'ar Efrayim Junction (557, local road)
 Sha'ar HaNegev Junction (34, 232; Sderot) 
 Sha'ar Hefer Junction (57, 5700)
 Sha'ariya Junction (40, 471)
 She'an Junction (71, 90)
 Sheva Junction (Hananya Junction) (85, 866)
 Shfar'am Junction (79, 311; Shefa-'Amr)
 Shifon Junction (91, 9099)
 Shilat Junction (443, 446)
 Shimshon Junction (38, 44)
 Shi'on Junction (99, 999)
 Shivta Junction (211, local road)
 Shizafon Junction (12, 40)
 Shluhot Junction (90, 669)
 Shomeret Junction (4, 8510)
 Sirkin Junction (40, 4730)
 Somekh Junction (70, 79)

T
 Talmon-Dolev Junction (450, 463)
 Tapu'ah Junction (60, 505)
 Tavor Junction (65, 7266)
 Tayasim Junction (40, 461)
 Tefen Junction (89, 854)
 Tel Akko Junction (85, 8510)
 Tel Eshtori Junction (71, 7079)
 Tira Junction (444, 554)
 Tlalim Junction (40, 211)
 Tze'elim Junction (40, 224)
 Tzemach Junction (90, 98)
 Tzihor Junction (13, 40)
 Tziporim Junction (40, local road)
 Tzrifin Junction (44, local road)
 Tzur Hadassa Junction (375, 386)
 Tzur Natan Junction (444, 5533)
 Umm al-Fahm Junction (65, local road)

U
 Urim Junction (234, 241)

V
 Vulcan Junction (4, local road)

W
 "West" Junction (HaEmir Junction) (959, 978)

Y
 Ya'ar Odem Junction (98, 978)
 Yad Mordechai Junction (4, 34)
 Yagur Junction (70, 75, 752)
 Yakir Gadol Junction (505, local road)
 Yanuv Junction (57, 5613)
 Yasif Junction (70, 85)
 Yavor Junction (70, 805)
 Yehudiya Junction (87, 92)
 Yeruham Junction (204, 225)
 Yesha Junction (886, 899)
 Yesod HaMa'ala Junction (90, 9119)
 Yiftach'el Junction (79, 784)
 Yishai Junction (75, 77)
 Yizra'el Junction (60, 675)
 Yodefet Junction (784, 7955)
 Yokne'am Junction (70, local road)
 Yuvalim Junction (784, 805)

Z
 Zemer Junction (574, 5714)
 Zikhron Ya'akov Junction (4, Nili Blvd., Zikhron Ya'akov)
 Zivan Junction (91, 98)
 Zohar Junction (21, 90)
 Zvulun Junction (70, 780)

Interchanges

A
Abba Hillel Interchange (482, Bialik St., Ramat Gan)
Adumim Interchange (1, 417)
Allenby Interchange (4, Allenby Rd., Haifa)
Aluf Sadeh Interchange (4, Sheba Rd., Ramat Ef'al)
Anava Interchange (1, 431)
Ashdod Interchange (4, 7, 41)
Atlit Interchange (2, 721, 7110)

B
Bar Ilan Interchange (4, 471)
Barkan Interchange (5, 4765)
Baqa-Jat Interchange (6, 61)
Batzra Interchange (4, local road)
Beko'a Interchange (3, local road)
Ben Gurion Interchange (1, 4503)
Ben Shemen Interchange (1, 6, 443, 444)
Benzion Netanyahu Interchange (50, Jerusalem Road 20)
Beit Horon Interchange (443, Local road)
 (22, Local road)
Bruchin Interchange (5, 446)

C
Caesarea Interchange (2, 65)

D
Daniel Interchange (1, 6)
Dov Hoz Interchange (20, Dov Hoz St. in Holon)
Dov Yosef Interchange (u.c.) (50, Dov Yosef Blvd. in Jerusalem)

E
Eilot Interchange (90, 109)
Ein HaKore Interchange (42, 431)
Elyakim Interchange (70, 672)
Eyal Interchange (6, 551)

G
Ganot Interchange (1, 4)
Gan Rave Interchange (4, 42, HaHistadrut St., Rishon LeZion)
Gdud 21 Interchange (4, HaHashmal St. in Haifa)
Geha Interchange (4, 481)
Gesher HaShalom Interchange (2, 5611)
Gesher Paz Interchange (4, 22, HaHashmal St. in Haifa)
Givat Mordechai (50, Shmuel Bait St. in Jerusalem)
Givat Shaul Interchange (50, Givat Shaul St. in Jerusalem)
Giv'at Shmu'el Interchange (4, Mivtza Kadesh St., Giv'at Shmu'el)
Glilot Ma'arav Interchange (2, 5)
Glilot Mizrah Interchange (5, 20)
 Golani Interchange (65, 77)
Golda Meir Interchange (50, 436)

H
Hadarim Interchange (4, 551)
HaHalakha Interchange (20, Rabbi Shlomo Goren St., Tel Aviv)
Haifa South Interchange (2, 4)
HaKerayot Interchange (4, 752)
HaKfar HaYarok Interchange (5, 482)
HaMinharot Interchange (u.c.) (50, 60, Rosmarin St. in Jerusalem)
HaRakevet Interchange (20, 481, Al Parashat Drakhim St, Tel Aviv)
Har'el Interchange (1, 3985)
HaShalom Interchange (20, Giv'at HaTahmoshet St., Tel Aviv)
HaShiv'a Interchange (4, 44)
HaSira Interchange (2, 541)
Hativat HaNegev Interchange (40, 60; Beersheba, Omer)
Havatselet Interchange (2, 5710)
HaZeitim Interchange (1, El-Hardub str. in Jerusalem)
Heil HaShiryon Interchange (2, 20, 461)
Hemed Interchange (1, 3975)
Hiram Interchange (4, 22)
Hof HaSharon Interchange (2, local roads)
Holon Interchange (20, 44, Levi Eshkol Blvd.)
Holot Interchange (4, 20)
Horshim Interchange (6, 531)

I
Iron Interchange (6, 65)

K
Kaplan Interchange (2, Kaplan St., Tel Aviv)
Keren Kayemet Interchange (20, Keren Kayemet Blvd., Tel Aviv)
Kfar Sava-Ra'anana North Interchange (4, Begin Blvd., Kfar Sava/Weitzmann St., Ra'anana)
Kibbutz Galuyot Interchange (1, 20, 461)
Kiryat Moshe Interchange (50, Yitzhak Rabin St. in Jerusalem)
Komemiyut Interchange (20, Moshe Dayan St., Holon)

L
LaGuardia Interchange (20, LaGuardia St., Tel Aviv)
Latrun Interchange (1, 3)
 Lehavim Interchange (6, 40, 310)
Lod Interchange (1, 40)

M
Malha Interchange (u.c.) (50, local streets)
Mesubim Interchange (4, 461)
Mevo Ayalon Interchange (20, 431)
Morasha Interchange (4, 5)
Moshe Dayan Interchange (4, 441)
Mota Gur Interchange (4, Halutzei HaTa'asiya St., Haifa)
Motza Interchange (1, Sorek St. in Jerusalem)

N
Nahshon-Neve Shalom Interchange (3, local road)
Nahshonim Interchange (6, 471)
Nesharim Interchange (6, 44, 431)
Ness Ziona Interchange (412, 431)
Netanya Interchange (2, 57)
Nitzanei Oz Interchange (6, 57)

O
Olga Interchange (2, Aaron Aaronsohn St. in Hadera)

P
Poleg Interchange (2, 553)

Q
Qassem Interchange (5, 6)

R
Ra'anana Darom Interchange (4, 554)
Rabin Interchange (Shmaryahu Interchange) (2, HaMa'apilim St., Kfar Shmaryahu)
Ramla South Interchange (40, 431)
Ramlod Interchange (40, 44)
Rishonim Interchange (412, 431)
Rishon LeZion Interchange (4, 441)
Rishon South Interchange (4, 431)
Rokach Interchange (20, Rokach Blvd., Tel Aviv)
Rosh HaAyin Mizrah Interchange (5, 5050)

S
Sha'ar HaGay Interchange (1, 38, 415)
Sha'ar Mizrah Interchange (1, 60)
Sha'ar Moriah Interchange (1, Ben Gurion Ave. in Jerusalem)
Sha'ar Shomron Interchange (5, 505)
Shapirim Interchange (1, 412)
Sarah Interchange (40, 25; Beersheba, Segev Shalom)
Shiv'at HaKokhavim Interchange (20, 541)
 Shoket Interchange
Shoresh Interchange (1, 3955)
Sorek Interchange (3, 7, 6)

T
Tikva Interchange (5, Zevulun Hammer Rd., Petah Tikva)

W
Wolffsohn Interchange (20, HaLohamim St., Tel Aviv-Yafo, Heinrich Heine St., Tel Aviv-Yafo)

Y
Yanai Interchange (2, 5720)
Yarkon Interchange (5, 40)
Yavne Interchange (4, 4111)
Yigael Yadin Interchange (1, 50, 436)
Yitzhak Shamir Interchange (u.c.) (50, Golumb St. in Jerusalem)
Yoseftal Interchange (20, Yoseftal blvd in Bat Yam)

Z
Zikhron Ya'akov Interchange (2, 70)

Railway junctions

Level junctions
Afek Junction (Tel Aviv – Rosh HaAyin Line, Eastern Line)
Na'an Junction (Tel Aviv–Beersheba line, Tel Aviv – Beit Shemesh line)
Tel Baruch Junction (Tel Aviv–Haifa line, Tel Aviv–Rosh HaAyin Line)
Remez Junction (Tel Aviv–Haifa line, Eastern Line). To become flying junction in the future.
Flying junctions
Lod Interchange (Tel Aviv–Modi'in/Jerusalem Line, Eastern Line).
Anava Interchange (Tel Aviv–Jerusalem Line, Modi'in branch)
Pleshet Junction (Rehovot–Ashdod line, Yavne West–Ashdod line, Port of Ashdod freight branch)
Shafirim Interchange (Tel Aviv–Lod line, Tel Aviv–Modi'in/Jerusalem line)

See also
List of highways in Israel
Roads in Israel
Transportation in Israel
Trempiada

Junctions
Junctions